Thomas Peters (born 1 February 1958), known professionally as Tommi Stumpff, is a German musician who played Electronic Body Music in the 1980s.

Biography
Stumpff spent his childhood with his family in Paris and Brussels before moving back to his birthplace, Düsseldorf. In the late 1970s he formed punk band KFC, as its lead singer.

His solo debut album Zu spät Ihr Scheisser was released on Düsseldorf independent label Schallmauer Records selling 3,000 units.

The following single Contergan Punk was released on the Giftplatten label in 1983. It was produced by sound engineer Conny Plank and featured a heavy electropunk sound that would become characteristic of EBM.

Discography
 1982 - Zu spät Ihr Scheisser (LP)
 1983 - Contergan Punk (12")
 1985 - Seltsames Glück (12")
 1988 - ...und so sterbt alle! (12")
 1988 - Meine Sklavin (7")
 1988 - Terror II (LP/CD)
 1989 - Ultra (LP/CD)
 1989 - Lobotomie
 1991 - Mich kriegt Ihr nicht (LP/CD)
 1991 - 13 Minuten Massaker (MCD)
 1991 - Trivial Shock (CD)
 1992 - Trivial Schock (Cuts)
 1992 - TV Ritual (MCD)
 1992 - Paradies (MCD)
 1992 - Brettermeier Die Pottsau – Arschkrampen-Tekkno (together with Dietmar Wischmeyer) (MCD/12")
 1993 - Bommerlunder (together with Luc Van Leuven as Die Technodosen) (MCD/12")
 1993 - Alle sind tot (CD)
 1993 - Oligophrenie (12")
 2002 - Festival of Darkness (Online Album)
 2021 - Alles Idioten (CD/LP/Download)

References

External links
 Official website
 Tommi Stumpff's Blog (in German)
 Interview with Tommi Stumpff:   (German)
 Tommi Stumpff's Discography at discogs.com

1958 births
Living people
German electronic musicians
Electronic body music musicians
German punk rock musicians